Florrie Forde (born Flora May Augusta Flannagan;16 August 187518 April 1940) was an Australian-born popular singer and music hall entertainer. From 1897 she lived and worked in the United Kingdom. She was one of the most popular stars of the early 20th century music hall.

Early life and career 
Forde was born in Fitzroy, Victoria, in 1875. She was the sixth of the eight children of Lott Flannagan, a stonemason, and Phoebe (née Simmons), who also had two children from a prior marriage. By 1878 her parents had separated and Phoebe married Thomas Ford, a theatrical costumier in 1888. Forde and some of her siblings were placed in a convent. At the age of sixteen, she ran away to live with an aunt in Sydney. When she appeared on the local music hall stage, she adopted her stepfather's surname but added an 'e'. 

According to The Sydney Morning Heralds reviewer, at one of her earliest vaudeville performances in January 1892, "[i]n the first part the vocalists were all well received, and several had to respond to encores. The serio-comic song by Miss Florrie Ford, 'Yes, You Are,' proved a great attraction."  Another of her earliest vaudeville performances was in February 1892 at Polytechnic Music Hall in Pitt Street. She toured widely in Australia over the next few years, performing as a soubrette, or in pantomimes as a "principal boy".

Success in Britain 
At the age of 21, in 1897, she left for London. On August Bank Holiday 1897, she made her first appearances in London at three music halls – the South London Palace, the Pavilion and the Oxford – in the course of one evening, and became an immediate star.  Forde had a powerful stage presence, and specialised in songs that had memorable choruses in which the audience was encouraged to join. She was soon drawing top billing, singing songs such as "Down at the Old Bull and Bush" and "Has Anybody Here Seen Kelly?". She appeared in the very first Royal Variety Performance in 1912.   

At the height of her popularity during World War I, her songs were some of the best known of the period, including "Pack Up Your Troubles in Your Old Kit-Bag", "It's A Long Way To Tipperary" and "Take Me Back to Dear Old Blighty".  She was described by W. J. MacQueen-Pope as the "female epitome of music hall gusto; she controlled an audience, she made them sing, she had memorable songs and nobody ever sang those songs as she could". Theatre historian Roy Busby described her as "a fine buxom woman, splendid in feathers, sequins and tights."  She made the first of her many sound recordings in 1903 and in all made 700 individual recordings by 1936.   

She ran her own touring revue company, which provided a platform for new rising stars, the most famous being the singing duo of Flanagan and Allen.   For 36 consecutive years Forde performed for a summer season at Douglas, Isle of Man.  She continued to appear in London pantomimes as a "principal boy" into the 1930s, when she was in her sixties, and performed in the 1935 Royal Variety Performance.  At the start of the Second World War, she planned to continue to entertain the troops.

She collapsed and died from a cerebral haemorrhage after singing for troops in Aberdeen, Scotland, on 18 April 1940; she was 64.

Personal life 
On 2 January 1893 in Sydney, she married Walter Emanuel Bew, a 31-year-old police constable. On 22 November 1905 at the register office, Paddington, London, as Flora Augusta Flanagan, spinster, she married Laurence Barnett (d. 1934), an art dealer.

Legacy 
The Anglo-Irish poet Louis MacNeice left a tribute to her in a poem, 'Death of an Actress', recalling how:<blockquote>With an elephantine shimmy and a sugared winkShe threw a trellis of Dorothy Perkins rosesAround an audience come from slum and suburbAnd weary of the tea-leaves in the sink.</blockquote>

She is buried in Streatham Park Cemetery, London.

 National Film and Sound Archive 

Florrie Forde's song Hold Your Hand Out Naughty Boy was added to the National Film and Sound Archive's Sounds of Australia registry in 2013.

 Selected songs 

 "Down at the Old Bull and Bush"
 "She's a Lassie from Lancashire"
 "Oh! Oh! Antonio!"
 "Has Anybody Here Seen Kelly?"
 "Flanagan"
 "Take Me Back to Dear Old Blighty"
 "Hold Your Hand Out, Naughty Boy"
 "Good-bye-ee!"
 "A Bird in a Gilded Cage"
 "Daisy Bell"
 "I Do Like to Be Beside the Seaside"
 "Now I Have to Call him Father"
 "Pack Up Your Troubles in Your Old Kit Bag"
 "It's a Long Way to Tipperary"

 Selected filmography 
 My Old Dutch (1934)
 Say It with Flowers'' (1934)

References

External links 

 
Florrie Forde – you can hear her sing 'I Do Like to Be Beside the Seaside'
Eight digitally restored recordings to listen to or download.

findagrave.com (2 memorials)

1875 births
1940 deaths
Music hall performers
Australian emigrants to England
Australian expatriates in England
Burials at Streatham Park Cemetery
19th-century Australian women singers
20th-century Australian women singers
People from Fitzroy, Victoria